Osher Davida (born 18 February 2001) is an Israeli professional footballer who plays as a winger or as a centre-forward for Belgian First Division A club Standard Liège and the Israel national under-21 team.

Early life
Davida was born and raised in Ashdod, Israel, to a family of Jewish background.

Club career

Hapoel Tel Aviv
In 2015, Davida signed with Israeli Premier League club Hapoel Tel Aviv. On 30 July 2018, He made his senior debut in a 2–3 loss to Ashdod. On 9 November 2020, Davida scored his debut senior goal in the 1–0 win against Hapoel Hadera.

Standard Liège
On 23 August 2022, Davida signed a four-year contract with Belgian First Division A side Standard Liège.

Career statistics

Club

See also 
 List of Jewish footballers
 List of Jews in sports
 List of Israelis

References

External links
 
 
 
 

2001 births
Footballers from Ashdod
Living people
Israeli footballers
Jewish footballers
Israeli Jews
Israel youth international footballers
Israel under-21 international footballers
Association football forwards
Hapoel Tel Aviv F.C. players
Standard Liège players
Israeli Premier League players
Israeli expatriate footballers
Expatriate footballers in Belgium
Israeli expatriate sportspeople in Belgium